Golf Mill Shopping Center, or simply Golf Mill, is a shopping mall located at 239 Golf Mill Center in Niles, Illinois. It is managed by Sterling Retail Services. It borders the intersections of Golf Road (Illinois Route 58), Milwaukee Avenue (Illinois Route 21) and Greenwood Avenue. The shopping mall has over 100 specialty shops, three anchor stores (JCPenney, Target, and Ross Dress for Less), an AMC Theatres, a grocery store (Gordon Food Service), an XSport Fitness gym, and a 9-story office tower and other outparcels. Former anchors included Sears and Roebuck (closed December 2018), and Kohl's (closed Halloween 2020).

History
Golf Mill opened to the public in October 1960 as an open-air mall and featured an office tower (designed by Chicago architect Edo Belli to look like the top of a golf ball) and Sears. It featured a full "mill" theme, complete with ponds, bridges, and a working waterwheel. Soon after opening, a Lord's department store was built, but closed after a few years and was replaced by JCPenney. Around that time, the Mill Run Playhouse was built at the north end of the complex that wasn't connected to the corridors.
General Growth Properties took over the management of the Golf Mill Shopping Center in 1994.

After General Growth Properties went bankrupt, Milwaukee Golf Management Corporation took over the management of the Golf Mill Shopping Center in 2009. Sterling Organization purchased Golf Mill Shopping Center in August 2014 via a private equity fund, and its subsidiary, Sterling Retail Services is currently managing the property on behalf of the fund.

Store Openings 
In 1989, MainStreet was acquired by Kohl's.  

On October 11, 1998, a Target opened in the north wing across from Kohl's.

In 2005, Value City Furniture opened, replacing some inline stores and an entrance. 

In 2010, Kerasotes ShowPlace 12 was acquired by AMC. 

Circuit City which opened in 1990 and located outside the mall closed in the mid-2000s. It was later replaced with a Lucky McGee's sports bar. It closed in January 2016.

Gordon Food Service opened outside of the mall to customers on October 18, 2011, located on the south section of the parking lot near JCPenney.

Ross Dress for Less opened in 2012, replacing a dead section of the mall.

The mall added a Panera Bread across the main entrance in early 2017. 

Ulta Beauty opened in November 2017, replacing the south section of the food court.

On October 4, 2018, it was announced that Sears would be closing as part of a plan to close 12 stores nationwide. The store closed in December 2018.

A Chase Bank has been built next to the Panera Bread and opened to the public August 2020. The mall has also built a Chick-fil-A restaurant on the northwest corner of the parking lot, which opened on October 12, 2021.

On August 21, 2020, Kohl's announced that they will permanently close their store at Golf Mill to relocate to a brand new shopping center in Morton Grove, Illinois, called Sawmill Station. The store officially closed on Halloween 2020. A Burlington store opened on October 29, 2021, in the first floor of the former space.

In January 2022, the mall announced that it will be redeveloping most of the mall, planning to demolish the former Sears, AMC, Iconic Circular Tower, and various outlots as part of a "live work play" styled development. The new development would bring back the water wheel, add new outdoor retail, apartment complexes, new greenspace.

Renovations 
In 1986, the mall had major renovations, with the north end being completely rebuilt as an enclosed portion anchored by MainStreet and enclosing the mall between the Sears and JCPenney, also adding a food court in the process. 

In 2006, GGP remodeled the mall complete with new flooring and a new food court entrance, however the north wing and a  corridor in the south wing were left untouched. The remodel also added a 12-screen Kerasotes movie theater.

When Ulta first opened in 2017, the mall has planned to relocate the former south food court next to AMC, but it was scrapped.

In January 2022, the mall announced that it will be redeveloping most of the mall, planning to demolish the former Sears, AMC, Iconic Circular Tower, and various outlots as part of a "live work play" styled development. The new development would bring back the water wheel, add new outdoor retail, apartment complexes, new greenspace. JCPenney, Ulta Beauty, Chick-fil-et, Panera, Chase, X-Sport Fitness, Burlington, Target, and other stores will remain.

Bus routes 
Pace

  208 Golf Road  
  240 Dee Road  
  241 Greenwood/Talcott  
  270 Milwaukee Avenue OR Pulse Pace Bus  
  272 Milwaukee Avenue North  
  410 East Niles Local  
  411 West Niles Local  
  412 North Niles Circulator

References

External links

Cuneo family sells Golf Mill Shopping Center for $60 million 

Niles, Illinois
Shopping malls in Cook County, Illinois
Shopping malls established in 1960
1960 establishments in Illinois